Esti Rosenberg (Hebrew: אסתי רוזנברג; born July 24, 1965) is an American-Israeli Orthodox Rabbanit who is the founder and head of the Migdal Oz seminary. She is the daughter of Rabbi Aharon Lichtenstein and Dr. Tovah Soloveitchik and the granddaughter of Joseph B. Soloveitchik.

Biography 
Esti Rosenberg was born in 1965 in the United States, the fourth child of her parents, Aharon Lichtenstein and Tova Lichtenstein, and immigrated to Israel with her parents on Aliyah in 1971 at the age of six, when her father was offered the position of Rosh Yeshiva at Yeshivat Har Etzion. She studied at the Chorev Ulpana in Jerusalem and was a member of the Ezra youth movement. Rosenberg graduated with a bachelor's degree in Hebrew Literature and History from Hebrew University. She studied Tanach studies at the Jerusalem Michlalah and learned in one of the first graduating classes of Matan Jerusalem.

Rosenberg was Rosh Beit Midrash at Midreshet Bruriah, now known as Midreshet Lindenbaum, and served as Training Coordinator of Bnei Akiva's Jerusalem region. In 1997 she founded Migdal Oz, the sister school of Yeshivat Har Etzion, under the guidance of Aharon Lichtenstein and Yehuda Amital. Rosenberg gives many Shiurim throughout Israel, is a member of Bnei Akiva's national administration and participates in peace dialogue groups between the religious and secular and between the right-wing and left-wing groups in Israel.

Worldview 
Regarding the establishment of a Beit Midrash/seminary for women, Rosenberg said, "Placing Torah learning at the center of the beit midrash challenged the community of learners to delve into the experience of Abaye and Rava and into the halachic sugyot alongside serious, critical thinking and learning. It is in part a building of their religious personalities and in part a meaningful breakthrough for the integration of women into the world of Torah and placing them as exemplary role models for the girls who they will teach." (Translated from original Hebrew.)

Rosenberg believes, in line with the views of her grandfather Joseph B. Soloveitchik, that Torah study is a fundamental and significant component of Avodat Hashem for the Jewish woman. This includes all fields of Torah, including Talmud, Tanach, machshevet Yisrael and chassidut. All these subjects are taught in depth at Migdal Oz with an emphasis on independent learning b'chravuta which is crucial in cultivating Torah learning as a substantive component in the life of the student. Rosenberg has stated that learning in the beit midrash is a merit that becomes an obligation towards the Jewish People. Therefore, she calls upon her students to influence all areas of life in Israeli society, especially in the professions of teaching and education.

Rosenberg has been a prominent figure in the struggle to obtain serious and high-level Torah learning opportunities for women.

Personal 
Rosenberg is married to Herzl Rosenberg. They have seven children and live in Alon Shevut.

Family tree

References 

Living people
1965 births
Yeshivat Har Etzion
Soloveitchik rabbinic dynasty
Israeli settlers
Orthodox women rabbis
Israeli women educators
20th-century Israeli women
21st-century Israeli women
American emigrants to Israel
Rebbetzins
Hebrew University of Jerusalem alumni